Caragana arborescens, the Siberian peashrub, Siberian pea-tree, or caragana, is a species of legume native to Siberia and parts of China (Heilongjiang, Xinjiang) and neighboring Mongolia and Kazakhstan. It was taken to the United States by Eurasian immigrants, who used it as a food source while travelling west. In some areas of the United States it is considered an invasive species.  Introduced on the Canadian prairies in the 1880's, the hardy caragana provided shelter-belts, wildlife habitat, nitrogen fixation, and wind-breaks to prevent soil erosion and snow drifting.

Description 
Typically, it has a moderate to fast growth rate, being able to grow one to three feet during the first year after trimming.

The leaves vary from light green to dark green, and are alternate and compound with many small leaflets. Fragrant yellow flowers bloom in May or June. The fruits are legumes which contain many seeds, and ripen in July. As the seed pods dry they have a tendency to twist and pop open, releasing the seeds.

Uses 
Caragana arborescens can be grown as an ornamental plant and bonsai. It has an extensive root system, and can be used in erosion control. The fragrant flowers attract bees.

The seeds are edible, but should be cooked before being eaten. Caragana arborescens contains the non proteinogenic amino acid L-canavanine and may store from nearly 6 to 13% L-canavanine by dry weight. There have been no verified cases of poisoning from consuming the seeds. The flowers are also edible, and can be used in salads.

It is recommended for planting in the outer rows of multi-row plantings. It can be used to neutralize soil to prepare for further planting. As a legume, C. arborescens fixes nitrogen. It is suitable for planting in single-row field windbreaks where a dense, short barrier is desired.

C. arborescens is used for nesting by several songbirds. The seeds are occasionally eaten by a few songbirds. The plant is not a preferred food for browsing animals, but its fragrant flowers attract many pollen-consuming animals.

References

External links 
Germplasm Resources Information Network: Caragana arborescens Lam.
Jepson Manual Treatment
Purdue New Crops Profile
Siberian pea-tree
Caragana arborescens Siberian Pea Tree Bonsai Guide

Hedysareae
Flora of China
Flora of Kazakhstan
Flora of Mongolia
Flora of Russia
Flora of Siberia
Edible legumes
Edible nuts and seeds